The Watermelon Suite is an album performed by multi-instrumentalist Joe McPhee's Trio X recorded in 1998 and first released on the CIMP label.

Reception

Allmusic reviewer Steve Loewy states "The mood is generally more pensive than to be expected, although fires are lit in a few of the pieces. McPhee shows himself to be a thoughtful, sensitive player, where every note counts and space is just as important... The results are somewhat mixed, though McPhee and Duval fans should find moments of inspiration".

Track listing 
All compositions by Joe McPhee, Dominic Duval and Jay Rosen except as indicated
 "Points" - 7:21
 "The Watermelon Suite Part 1: The Whole" (Duval, McPhee) - 4:41
 "The Watermelon Suite Part 2: The Rind" (Duval, McPhee) - 3:11
 "The Watermelon Suite Part 3: The Meat" (Duval, McPhee) 7:39
 "The Watermelon Suite Part 4: The Seeds" (Duval, McPhee) - 2:28
 "Wecotdo Part 1" - 5:50
 "Wecotdo Part 2" - 3:36
 "Soundboard Safari" (Duval, Rosen) - 4:47
 "Solero" - 6:09
 "A Ballad in Their Own Way" - 6:08
 "Putter Piece"  - 11:26
 "My Funny Valentine" (Lorenz Hart, Richard Rodgers) - 9:40

Personnel 
Joe McPhee - soprano saxophone (tracks 1-7 & 9-12)
Dominic Duval - bass
Jay Rosen - drums, percussion

References 

Trio X albums
1999 albums
CIMP albums